Michael Patrick Allen (born 1967) is an American lawyer and academic who serves as a judge of the United States Court of Appeals for Veterans Claims. Prior to assuming his current role, he was a professor of law and director of the Veterans Law Institute at Stetson University College of Law.

Biography 

Allen received his Bachelor of Arts in American history and political science, summa cum laude, from the University of Rochester in 1989, where he was elected to Phi Beta Kappa, and his Juris Doctor from Columbia Law School in 1992, where he was a Harlan Fiske Stone Scholar.

Allen spent nine years in private practice as a civil trial attorney at the law firm Ropes & Gray in Boston, Massachusetts. He then joined the Stetson University College of Law faculty, where he taught courses in civil and constitutional law, as well as veterans' benefits law. He is a recognized expert on the law of veterans' benefits and has testified before Congress and published widely in the field.

Court of Appeals for Veterans Claims service 

On June 7, 2017, President Donald Trump nominated Allen to serve as a Judge of the United States Court of Appeals for Veterans Claims. A hearing on his nomination before the Senate Veterans' Affairs Committee was held on July 19, 2017. On July 20, 2017, the committee voted to report his nomination. His nomination was confirmed by the Senate with a voice vote on August 3, 2017.

References

External links 
 
 Biography at U.S. Court of Appeals for Veterans Claims

1967 births
Living people
21st-century American lawyers
21st-century American judges
Columbia Law School alumni
Judges of the United States Court of Appeals for Veterans Claims
Stetson University College of Law faculty
United States Article I federal judges appointed by Donald Trump
University of Rochester alumni